The Musée Bolo or Swiss Museum of Computer Science, Digital Culture and Video Games is a private museum dedicated to the digital revolution. Its exhibition space is located on the site of the École Polytechnique Fédérale de Lausanne (EPFL) in Lausanne, Romandy, Switzerland. Its main storage area is located near Lausanne Train Station.

Collections 
Within the museum is a collection of old computers dating from the 1960s to the 1990s in danger of disappearance. This is named Bolo's Computer Museum (BCM), and opened in June 2002. Besides old computers, this collection  includes other items associated with old computers, such as peripheral devices, hardware documentation and related books and magazines. Among them is the Contraves Cora anti-aircraft fire control computer.

On 10 November 2011, BMC opened its permanent exhibit, titled "Programmed disappearance", which includes the rarest objects of its collection. Its theme is the various ways in which computers, through trends such as miniaturisation or cloud computing, tend to blend into the background of everyday life and become both pervasive and invisible.

In 2017, Logitech put a number of rare or iconic items on display

See also 
 Lausanne campus

References

External links 

Official website 
Bolo Museum
Grappe de PC Linux pour le Calcul à Haute Performance

Computer museums
École Polytechnique Fédérale de Lausanne
Museums in Lausanne
Science museums in Switzerland